For the community of the same name, see: Macdonald, Manitoba

Macdonald is a rural municipality lying adjacent to the southwest side of Winnipeg, Manitoba, Canada. It is part of the Winnipeg Metro Region, but is not part of the smaller Winnipeg census metropolitan area. Macdonald's population as of the 2016 census was 7,162.

The municipality is named for Canada's first Prime Minister, Sir John A. Macdonald.

Communities
 Brunkild
 Domain
 La Salle
 Oak Bluff
 Osborne
 Sanford
 Starbuck

Demographics 

Water 
Water services are sourced from the La Salle River and is treated by a Water Treatment Plant located in Sanford. In 2016 an application to the Manitoba Water Services Board to expand the raw water storage facility by adding a fourth pond with a 90 dam3 capacity was made. Included in the project was a new aeration system for all four ponds.

References

Further reading

External links
 Official website
Community Profile: Macdonald Rural Municipality, Manitoba; Statistics Canada
 Map of Macdonald R.M. at Statcan

Macdonald
John A. Macdonald
Macdonald